Fabrice Borer (born 24 December 1971) is a Swiss former professional footballer who played as a goalkeeper.

Career
Born in Delémont, Borer played for SR Delémont, FC Lausanne-Sport, FC Sion and Grasshopper Club Zürich. He also played three times for the Switzerland national team. He ended his career at the end of the 2006–07 Super League season.

He was initially named in Switzerland's UEFA Euro 2004 squad but had to withdraw through injury and was replaced by Sébastien Roth.

References

External links

1971 births
Living people
People from Delémont
Swiss men's footballers
Association football goalkeepers
Switzerland international footballers
Swiss Super League players
Swiss Challenge League players
FC Lausanne-Sport players
Grasshopper Club Zürich players
SR Delémont players
FC Sion players
Sportspeople from the canton of Jura